Judaai is a 1980 Indian Hindi-language drama film, produced by A.V. Subba Rao under the Prasad Art Pictures banner and directed by T. Rama Rao. The film stars Jeetendra and Rekha, with music composed by Laxmikant–Pyarelal. It is remake of the Telugu film Aalu Magalu (1977).

Plot
The film begins with Dr. Shashikanth Verma (Jeetendra) a happy-go-lucky with bountiful girlfriends, the son of wealthy Retired judge Umakanth Verma (Ashok Kumar). Gauri (Rekha) a self-esteem woman, resides at Shashi's outhouse and administrates Umakanth's house with her amiable and authoritative behavior. Since childhood, Shashi & Gauri squabble but have untold love. Meanwhile, Shashi moves abroad for higher studies when Umakanth passes away making a testament that Shashi must marry Gauri. Knowing it, Shashi accuses Gauri when she renounces the wealth and is about to quit. At that juncture, forlorn Shashikanth bars and marries her. Soon they are blessed with a baby boy Ravikanth. Thereafter, Gauri spots Shashi with his ex-girlfriend Krishna (Asha Sachdev). Without knowledge of the actuality that Shashi is treating her ailing daughter, she suspects their relationship which results in the death of the kid. Hence a rift arises between the couple when Gauri the pregnant lady, moves out but Shashi retains Ravi. Soon, she gives birth to another child Umakanth. Years roll by, and Ravikanth (Sachin) grows up under the pampering of his father whereas Umakanth (Arun Govil) turns into a meritorious student with Gauri's effort. Right now, the siblings join the same workplace, become good friends, and marry their love interests Monica (Tamanna) and Manisha (Shoma Anand), respectively. Here, destiny brings the couple near but conceit makes them stand far. Later the couple is humiliated by the children giving priority to their wives. At this point, they realize that their real companion is their best half. So, they immediately rush when learning the devilry of children towards their spouse and contrariwise make them plead pardon. Finally, the movie ends on a happy note with the reunion of the couple.

Cast
 Ashok Kumar as Retired Justice Umakant Verma
 Jeetendra as Dr. Shashikant Verma
 Rekha as Gauri Verma
 Deven Varma as Ram Narayan "R. N."
 Madan Puri as Mr. Dube 'Mamaji'
 Sachin as Ravikant Verma "Ravi"
 Arun Govil as Umakant Verma
 Shoma Anand as Manisha 
 Tamanna as Monica 
 A. K. Hangal as Narayan Singh 
 Asit Sen as Constable Dinanath Tiwari
 Helena Luke as Madhavika 
 Asha Sachdev as Krishna
 Aruna Irani as Miss Lily (Dancer)

Crew
Direction – T. Rama Rao
Story – M. Balamurugan
Screenplay – T. Rama Rao
Dialogue – Dr. Rahi Masoom Reza
Production – Anumolu Venkata Subba Rao
Production Company – Prasad Art Pictures
Editing – J. Krishnaswamy, V. Balasubramaniam
Art Direction – G.V. Subba Rao
Costume Design – Akbar Gabbana, Leena Daru
Choreography – Hiralal, Manohar Naidu, Suresh Bhatt
Music Direction – Laxmikant–Pyarelal
Lyrics – Anand Bakshi
Playback – Amit Kumar, Anuradha Paudwal, Asha Bhosle, Chandrani Mukherjee, Kishore Kumar, Lata Mangeshkar, Mohammad Rafi, Shailendra Singh

Soundtrack
Lyrics: Anand Bakshi

Awards
1981 Filmfare Awards - Nominated
Best Actress - Rekha
Best Comedian - Deven Verma

References

External links

1980 films
1980s Hindi-language films
Films directed by T. Rama Rao
Films scored by Laxmikant–Pyarelal
Hindi remakes of Telugu films